Emich Christian of Leiningen-Dagsburg (29 March 1642, in Dagsburg – 27 April 1702) was, by descent, Count of Leiningen and Dagsburg and, by inheritance, Lord of Broich, Oberstein and Bürgel.

Life 
Emich Christian was a son of the Count Emich XIII of Leiningen-Dagsburg (1612–1658) and Countess Dorothea of Waldeck-Wildungen (1617–1661).

After the death of his father-in-law Count William Wirich of Daun-Falkenstein in 1682, Emich Christian took possession of the inheritance. On 8 October, Elector Palatine John William invested him with the Lordship of Broich.

In March 1688, Elector Palatine John William decided an inheritance dispute about Broich and Bürgel between Emich Christian and his nephew John in favour of the latter.

Marriage and issue 
On 17 July 1664 in Falkenstein, Emich Christian married to Christiane Louise (1640–1717), daughter of Count William Wirich of Daun-Falkenstein and Countess Elisabeth of Waldeck (1610–1647). They had two children:
 Elisabeth Dorothea (11 June 1665–1722)
 married on 19 October 1692 to Moritz Hermann of Limburg (1664–1703)
 Frederick (d. 1709)

Leiningen family
Lords of Broich
Counts of Germany
1642 births
1702 deaths
17th-century German people